Custody may refer to:

Government and law
 Child custody, a description of the legal relationship between a parent (or guardian) and child
 Custody and repatriation, a Chinese administrative procedure 1982–2003
 Legal custody, a legal term in England and Wales for a person held under the law
 Arrest or police custody, a lawful holding of a person by removing their freedom of liberty
 Remand (detention), otherwise known as remanded in custody
 Imprisonment (Terminology varies, but in common law, detention before charge is referred to as custody and continued detention after conviction is referred to as imprisonment.)

Organizations and enterprises
 Custodian bank, a specialized financial institution responsible for safeguarding a firm's or individual's financial assets
  Custos (Franciscans), often referred to as custody, the institution of  the Franciscan Order of the Catholic Church

Arts, entertainment, and media

Films
 Custody (1988 film), Australian TV film featuring Peter Carroll
 Custody (2000 film), American comedy film starring Linda Larkin
 Custody (2007 film), American Lifetime TV film starring Rob Morrow
 Custody (2016 film), American courtroom drama film
 Custody (2017 film), French film

Television
 "Custody" (Flashpoint), a 2009 episode of Flashpoint
 "Custody" (Law & Order), an episode of Law & Order

See also 
 Custodian (disambiguation)